Teresa Hillary Clarke (born February 8, 1963), is a prominent American investment banker, entrepreneur, and expert on Africa. Her career has spanned a wide range, from being a managing director at Goldman Sachs to co-founding a scholarship and mentoring non-profit, Student Sponsorship Programme in South Africa. Over the last several years, she has funded and led Africa.com, the largest Africa-related website.

Growing up in California, Teresa H. Clarke descends from a line of prominent women, including her mother and grandmother who were both alumni of Howard University and went on to successful careers in education and community service. Her mother, Dr. Audrey Clarke, retired after serving for ten years as the superintendent of schools in Lynwood, California and later became a professor at California State University at Northridge in the graduate school of education.

Her mother graduated from Howard University in 1958, Phi Beta Kappa and magna cum laude and won a Fulbright Scholarship to the University of Buenos Aires in Argentina that same year.  Her grandmother attended Howard as a member of the class of 1933. In honor of their Howard legacies, Dr. Audrey M. Clarke established the Audrey M. Clarke and Elvira F. Clarke Fellowship for International Learning at Howard University.

Clarke has a bachelor's degree in economics, cum laude, from Harvard College (1980–1984), an M.B.A. from Harvard Business School (1989) and a J.D. from Harvard Law School (1989). She has served on the boards of Southern Africa Legal Services (Legal Resource Centre), the Tony Elumelu Foundation, the Opportunity Agenda, serves on the board of the Student Sponsorship Programme South Africa and is an emeriti board member of the Harvard Business School Alumni Association.

Clarke is fluent in Spanish, French and Portuguese and is a member of the Council on Foreign Relations. She has received numerous awards for her work in Africa, including the Government of South Africa's Freedom Day Award, the Education Africa's Humanitarian Award for Africa, the Merrill Lynch/Africa 2.0 Business Leadership Award, the International Women's Society Humanitarian of the Year Award, the Malcolm X and Dr. Betty Shabazz Educational Leadership Award, and the Girl Scouts of Connecticut Woman of Achievement. Clarke was named one of the top 25 Women in Business by the Network Journal.

In 2010, Black Entertainment Television honored Clarke and won the Shot Caller Award on their internationally televised awards show Black Girls Rock!

Background

In August 1989, Teresa Clarke joined the real-estate department at Goldman Sachs & Co. in New York as an associate. She worked in the investment banking division for six years before leaving to found and serve as managing director of the South African office of Abt Associates, the Cambridge (Mass.) public-policy & management consulting firm. Her clients in South Africa included companies such as Transnet (holding company of South African Airways), Johnson & Johnson, and institutions involved in the coordination of the education and public health development sectors.

Teresa Clarke lived in South Africa from 1995 to 2000. During her time in South Africa, Clarke also taught corporate finance in the MBA program at Wits Business School.

In 1999, she co-founded Student Sponsorship Programme South Africa.  SSP provides academically talented but economically disadvantaged South African students with scholarships and support to attend private schools. The non-profit trust program based in Johannesburg has provided more than $10 million in scholarships to more than 1000 children. Some 90 percent of the students complete the program. About 90 percent of SSP's graduates qualify to attend university. For her work with SSP ZA, Clarke has been recognized by the South African government, among many others.

From 2004 to 2010, Clarke returned to Goldman Sachs. Her first contribution was to play a key role in launching the firm's Global Markets Institute. She later moved back into the investment banking division where she led mergers and acquisitions, and corporate finance transactions for Fortune 500 companies in the US and Europe. She was also the manager of the GS Africa Aspen Program, a leadership development project for emerging public- and private-sector African leaders created in cooperation with the Aspen Institute.

Recent events
On February 12, 2010, Teresa Clarke ended a 12-year career at Goldman Sachs to focus on Africa.com, She launched Africa.com in February 2010, her goals for Africa.com were to change the way the world engages online with Africa and to be the platform for those changes, stating:

Clarke has been featured as an Africa expert at the World Economic Forum in Africa and India, the Milken Institute and the Fortune/Time/CNN Global Forum. In 2008, she received the Freedom Day Award from the South African Consulate. On November 4, 2010, Clarke was a speaker at African Leadership Network's inaugural ceremony. This event is the equivalent of the World Economic Forum in Davos but organized by and for Africans and people of African descent. She has also lectured at various institutes of higher learning, including Oxford, Harvard, Princeton, Yale, Stanford, Tufts universities, and the Wharton School.

On November 7, 2010, Clarke was among the honorees being celebrated on Black Entertainment Television's (BET) event called Black Girls Rock!.

Clarke is the writer, producer and director of Africa Straight Up, a 30-minute documentary made in partnership with MTV Africa and TEDTalks that was released in 2012. While originally produced for online viewing, the film aired on the Africa Channel in the U.S. and UK, as well as on Dutch Television. It also was screened by The White House, which had contributed to the film's production, during the 2014 United States–Africa Leaders Summit and by the Council on Foreign Relations and was shown as in-flight entertainment on South African Airways and Arik Airways.

In 2013, Clarke was invited to join The White House Traveling Press Corps and traveled with President Obama and his family to Senegal, South Africa, and Tanzania. That same year she delivered a TEDx Talk at TEDxEuston in London, "The Diaspora Divide". 
 
In 2014, she was featured on the Harvard Business School website in a video on Making a Difference. Her life story was also the subject of a profile celebrating the 50th Anniversary of Women at Harvard Business School. That year she was invited to the Fletcher Inclusive Business Summit. A summit at the Rockefeller Foundation's Bellagio Center, whose grounds have been preserved with the express mission to encourage pause and enable leaders from around the world to address the world's many complex needs.

In November 2014, U.S. Secretary of Commerce Penny Pritzker appointed Clarke and 14 other private sector leaders to the President Obama's Advisory Council on Doing Business in Africa (PAC-DBIA). Its members were selected to advise the President, through the Secretary of Commerce, on strengthening commercial engagement between the United States and Africa.

In May 2020, she led the Africa.com Crisis Management for African Business Leaders webinar series entitled "Women are Proving to Be Great Leaders During COVID-19. Is this the Pathway to Power?", and its panel, which included former Deputy President of South Africa, Under Secretary of the United Nations and executive director of the UN Women Phumzile Mlambo-Ngcuka, Stanbic Bank Uganda CEO Anne Juuko, Oby Ezekwesili of the Africa Economic Development Policy Initiative, and Zambian youth activist and journalist Natasha Wang Mwansa, who is the youngest recipient of the WHO Global Health Leaders award.

Personal life
Clarke has married twice. Her second marriage took place at Martha's Vineyard on August 4, 2007, with Dr. John Edward Ellis, a professor of anesthesiology and critical care at the Pritzker School of Medicine at the University of Chicago.

References

External links
 Africa Straight Up - YouTube
 Africa.com website
 Student Sponsorship Programme website
 HBSAAA Biography

Living people
1963 births
Harvard Business School alumni
Harvard Law School alumni
American women chief executives
21st-century American women
Fulbright alumni